Evan Thomas Davies may refer to:

 Evan Tom Davies (1904–1973), Welsh mathematician and linguist
 Evan Thomas Davies (musician) (1847–1927), Welsh musician
 Evan Thomas Davies (cleric) (1847–1927), Welsh priest